Auratonota chlamydophora is a species of moth of the family Tortricidae and is endemic to Ecuador.

The ground colour of the forewings is pale yellowish cream, glossy along the marking edges. These markings have the form of golden yellow fasciae, marked with black. The hindwings are whitish, slightly suffused with greyish on the periphery and with a few grey strigulae near the apex.

Etymology
The species name refers to the forewing costa and is derived from Greek chlamys (meaning overcoat) and phoreo (meaning to carry).

References

External links

Moths described in 2006
Endemic fauna of Ecuador
chlamydophora
Moths of South America
Taxa named by Józef Razowski